'Azzun 'Atma is a Palestinian village in the Qalqilya Governorate in the western West Bank, located 5 kilometers South-east of Qalqilya. According to the Palestinian Central Bureau of Statistics, 'Azzun 'Atma had a population of approximately 1,670 inhabitants in mid-year 2006. 3.9% of the population of 'Azzun 'Atma were refugees in 1997. The healthcare facilities for 'Azzun 'Atma are designated as MOH level 2.

Location
‘Azzun ‘Atma is located 8.82 km south of Qalqiliya. It is bordered by Mas-ha and Sha'arei Tikva to the east, Az Zawiya to the south, Oranit to the west, and Beit ‘Amin and ‘Izbat Salman to the north.

History
Potsherds from the Iron Age II, Persian, Hellenistic, Byzantine, Byzantine/Umayyad, Crusader/Ayyubid and Mamluk eras have been found.
Old stones have been reused in homes, and the mosque is possibly an old church.

Ottoman era

The place appeared in 1596 Ottoman tax registers as 'Azzun, being in the Nahiya of Jabal Qubal of the Liwa of Nablus. It had a population of 29 households and 2 bachelors, all Muslim. The villagers paid a fixed tax rate of 33,3%, on wheat, barley, summer crops, olives, goats and beehives; a total of 4,200 akçe.
Potsherds from the early Ottoman era have also been found here.

When the French explorer Victor Guérin visited the place in 1870 it was described it as a large Arab village, then deserted. Many small, square houses were still partly standing, and near the mosque he noticed old columns and large stone from older buildings. Old fig trees and beautiful mimosa were scattered through the ruins. In the PEF's Survey of Western Palestine (1882), it is also described as a "ruined village".

Jordanian Era
In the wake of the 1948 Arab–Israeli War, and after the 1949 Armistice Agreements, Azzun Atma came under Jordanian rule.

Post-1967 
Since the Six-Day War in 1967, Azzun Atma has been under Israeli occupation.

After the 1995 accords, about 3.8% of village land was classified as Area B, the remaining 96.2% as Area C. Israel has confiscated 2,689 dunams of village land in order to construct three Israeli settlements of Sha'are Tikva, Oranit and Zamarot (Zamarot becoming part of Oranit), in addition to land for the Israeli West Bank barrier, which almost entirely surrounds Azzun Atma, and which also isolate the village from much of its remaining land behind the wall.

See also
Sanniriya

References

Bibliography

External links
Survey of Western Palestine, Map 14:  IAA, Wikimedia commons
‘Azzun ‘Atma Village (Fact Sheet), Applied Research Institute–Jerusalem, ARIJ 
‘Azzun ‘Atma Village Profile, ARIJ
‘Azzun ‘Atma, aerial photo, ARIJ
Development Priorities and Needs in ‘Azzun ‘Atma, ARIJ
Azzun- Atma: A village encircled by the Wall 17, May, 2004, POICA
Israeli Occupation Forces Expands its Siege on Residents of Azzun Atma – Qalqiliya Governorate 16, May, 2006, POICA
New Stage for completing the Segregation wall around 'Azzun 'Atma village in Qalqilyia, 02, October, 2006, POICA
 Azzun Atme village engulfed by two walls 05, November, 2007, POICA
Azzun Atmeh village completely sealed off by the Segregation Wall 01, March, 2009, POICA
Settlers of the Israeli Settlement of "Oranit" Set Lands of 'Azzun 'Atma village Ablaze 09, November, 2009, POICA
Israeli Colonists Pump Sewage towards a Palestinian School in 'Azzun 'Atma village 23, February, 2010, POICA
Azzun Atma Wall Section - Qalqiliya Governorate 06, December, 2011, POICA

Villages in the West Bank
Qalqilya Governorate
Municipalities of the State of Palestine